Dirt Metal is Finnish power metal band Thunderstone's fifth album. It features their new vocalist Rick Altzi (At Vance, Frequency (Band), Sandalinas)  and their new keyboardist Jukka Karinen (also of the band Status Minor).

Track listing
All songs written by Nino Laurenne, except where noted.
"Rebirth" - 0:38
"I Almighty" - 5:02
"Dirt Metal" (Titus Hjelm) - 3:58     
"Blood That I Bleed" - 4:17   
"Star" feat. Tomi Joutsen of Amorphis - 4:07    
"Ghosts Of Youth" (Laurenne, Hjelm, Rick Altzi) - 5:04     
"Counting Hours" - 4:26      
"Dodge The Bullet" - 3:53
"Deadlights" (Hjelm) - 3:38   
"At The Feet Of Fools" (Hjelm) - 4:31 
"Suffering Song" - 8:26

Personnel
Rick Altzi- lead vocals
Nino Laurenne- guitar, backing vocal
Titus Hjelm - bass, backing vocal
Mirka "Leka" Rantanen - drums
Jukka Karinen- keyboards

Chart Finnish

References

2009 albums